The Chicago, Rock Island & Pacific Railroad Depot, also known as the Rock Island Depot, is an historic building located in Atlantic, Iowa, United States.  The Chicago, Rock Island & Pacific Railroad built the first tracks through the area in 1868.  The city of Atlantic was founded at the time of the railroad construction.  It grew to become the largest and the most significant community along the Rock Island lines between Des Moines and Council Bluffs.  The present depot dates from 1898, and it is not a standard-plan depot for the railroad.  The unusual design suggests it is the work of an architect, possibly from Chicago.  It was built during a prosperous period for the railroad when it was able to replace its facilities along its mainline.  The express freight and baggage building attached to the depot was built at the same time.  The passenger depot replaced a frame combination passenger and freight depot a block away.  

Service included the CRI&P's Corn Belt Rocket and Rocky Mountain Rocket passenger lines. In the trains' final year there, the route was shortened to Chicago to Council Bluffs. Service ended on May 31, 1970; with the end of the Council Bluffs train. 

After its use as a depot, the building fell into disrepair before it was restored.  It now houses the local chamber of commerce.  The building was listed on the National Register of Historic Places in 1994.

References

Railway stations in the United States opened in 1898
Renaissance Revival architecture in Iowa
Transportation buildings and structures in Cass County, Iowa
National Register of Historic Places in Cass County, Iowa
Railway stations on the National Register of Historic Places in Iowa
Former railway stations in Iowa
Railway stations closed in 1970
Atlantic
Atlantic, Iowa
1898 establishments in Iowa